Jill Shumay (born October 23, 1974) is a Canadian curler from Regina, Saskatchewan. She won the 2013 Saskatchewan Scotties Tournament of Hearts, and skips her own team out of the Maidstone Curling Club. She was formerly the third for Patty Hersikorn.

Career
Born in Maidstone, Saskatchewan, Shumay won her first provincial title in 2013 with teammates Kara Johnston, Taryn Holtby (Schachtel) and Jinaye Ayrey. The rink finished the round robin undefeated in her group, and lost to Stefanie Lawton in the page playoff game. However, the team won the semifinal against Amber Holland and defeated the Lawton rink in the final. The win sent Shumay to her first national championship, where she led her team to a fifth place with a 6–5 win–loss record. Shumay's rink could not repeat at the 2014 Saskatchewan Scotties Tournament of Hearts, losing in a tie breaker match.

In 2014, Shumay replaced Johnston with Nancy Martin at third.

Personal life
Shumay works as an account receivable administrator with Saskatoon Media Group. She attended Maidstone Composite High School, Lakeland College and Saskatoon Business College.

External links
 

Living people
1974 births
Canadian women curlers
Curlers from Regina, Saskatchewan